Elena Petrovna Sokolova (born February 13, 1991, in Moscow) is a Russian freestyle swimmer. She competed at the 2008 Summer Olympics in the 800 m freestyle, placing 2nd in her heat and 7th in the final. She was also a member of the Russian 4×100 m freestyle relay, which placed 12th in the heats and did not advance to the final.

Sokolova won the 400m, 800m and 1,500m freestyle events in the 2007 European Junior Swimming Championships.

References

 
 

Russian female swimmers
Olympic swimmers of Russia
Swimmers at the 2008 Summer Olympics
Swimmers at the 2012 Summer Olympics
1991 births
Living people
Swimmers from Moscow
Medalists at the FINA World Swimming Championships (25 m)
Universiade silver medalists for Russia
Universiade medalists in swimming
Medalists at the 2013 Summer Universiade